Suregetes Cove is the 2.47 km wide cove indenting for 1.9 km the N coast of Krogh Island in Biscoe Islands, Antarctica.  It is entered east of Kuvikal Point and west of Zagrade Point.

The cove is named after the Thracian god Suregetes.

Location
British mapping in 1976.

Maps
 British Antarctic Territory.  Scale 1:200000 topographic map.  DOS 610 Series, Sheet W 66 66.  Directorate of Overseas Surveys, UK, 1976.
 Antarctic Digital Database (ADD). Scale 1:250000 topographic map of Antarctica. Scientific Committee on Antarctic Research (SCAR), 1993–2016.

References
 Bulgarian Antarctic Gazetteer. Antarctic Place-names Commission. (details in Bulgarian, basic data in English)
 Suregetes Cove. SCAR Composite Antarctic Gazetteer.

External links
 Suregetes Cove. Copernix satellite image

Coves of Graham Land
Landforms of the Biscoe Islands
Bulgaria and the Antarctic